Sangō Station (三郷駅) is the name of three train stations in Japan:

 Sangō Station (Aichi) - Meitetsu Seto Line
 Sangō Station (Nara) - JR West Kansai Main Line (Yamatoji Line)
 Etchū-Sangō Station - Toyama Chiho Railway Main Line